Robert Morrow VC (7 September 1891 – 26 April 1915) was a British recipient of the Victoria Cross, the highest and most prestigious award for gallantry in the face of the enemy that can be awarded to British and Commonwealth forces.

Details

Morrow was born in Newmills, Dungannon, County Tyrone, Ireland. He was 23 years old, and a private in the 1st Battalion, The Princess Victoria's Royal Irish Fusiliers, British Army during the First World War when the following deed took place for which he was awarded the Victoria Cross.

On 12 April 1915 near Messines, Belgium, Private Morrow rescued and carried to places of comparative safety several men who had been buried in the debris of trenches wrecked by shell fire. He carried out this work on his own initiative and under heavy fire from the enemy.

He was died of wounds at St. Jan on the Ypres Salient, Belgium, on 26 April 1915 and is buried in White House Commonwealth War Graves Commission Cemetery. His gravestone bears the inscription: GOD IS LOVE.

His Victoria Cross is displayed at the Royal Irish Fusiliers Museum in Armagh, Northern Ireland.

References

Further reading
The Register of the Victoria Cross (1981, 1988 and 1997)

Ireland's VCs  (Dept of Economic Development 1995)
Monuments to Courage (David Harvey, 1999)
Irish Winners of the Victoria Cross (Richard Doherty & David Truesdale, Four Courts, 2000 )

1891 births
1915 deaths
People from Dungannon
Royal Irish Fusiliers soldiers
Irish World War I recipients of the Victoria Cross
British Army personnel of World War I
British military personnel killed in World War I
Recipients of the Medal of St. George
British Army recipients of the Victoria Cross
Burials at White House Commonwealth War Graves Commission Cemetery
Military personnel from County Tyrone